The Central Depository of Armenia (CDA) is the Central Depository of Armenia, established in 1996. The CDA is one of the oldest securities market institutions in the country and is headquartered in Yerevan. The Central Bank of Armenia is the regulatory body of the CDA. The CDA is a full member of the Federation of Euro-Asian Stock Exchanges.

History 

The Central Depository of Armenia was founded on 1 October 1996, it was originally called the "National Centralized Register" and was renamed to the Central Depository of Armenia in April 1999. In August 2000, the CDA became a full member of the International Association of Exchanges, which includes 20 member organizations from CIS member states.

In November 2007, the Swedish exchange operator OMX and the Central Bank of Armenia concluded an agreement acquiring shares of the CDA and the Armenia Securities Exchange. In 2008, the American Nasdaq, Inc. acquired the CDA. In January 2008, negotiations were finalized and the CDA was fully owned by Nasdaq, Inc. OMX Group.

In June 2009, the CDA became a partner member of the Association of National Numbering Agencies (ANNA). In 2014, the CDA became a full member of ANNA.

In 2009, the Armenia Securities Exchange acquired full ownership of the CDA.

In December 2010, the CDA joined the SWIFT international system. In 2011, the CDA signed a cooperation agreement with the National Settlement Depository of Russia. Also in 2011, the CDA organized a joint conference between the European Central Securities Depositories Association and the International Association of Exchanges of CIS countries. It was the first joint event of the two regional stock exchanges and depositaries associations and was held in Yerevan.

In July 2016, Clearstream opened a direct link to the Armenian market, with Armenia becoming the 56th domestic market link. The company stated that this expansion was an important milestone for the Caucasus region.

In 2016, the CDA signed a cooperation agreement with the Central Depository of Belarus. In 2019, the CDA signed a memorandum of understanding with the Central Depository of Kyrgyzstan.

In September 2020, the International Conference of the Association of Eurasian Central Securities Depositories was held in Yerevan.

In December 2021, the CDA signed a memorandum of cooperation with the National Depository of Ukraine.

Services 
The CDA offers shareholders with register keeping services to joint stock companies, in addition to securities account opening and maintenance services to both corporate and individual clients. The CDA's primary objective is to be an efficient clearing and settlement house through the implementation of international best practices within the Armenian market and to provide cross-border financial services, acting as a gateway among regional economies.

Leadership 
Vahan Stepanyan has been the Chief Executive Officer of the CDA since April 2006.

See also 
 Economy of Armenia
 Government of Armenia
 List of banks in Armenia
 List of companies of Armenia
 National numbering agency
 Open joint-stock company

References

External links 
 Central Depository of Armenia official website

Central securities depositories
Securities clearing and depository institutions
Business organizations based in Armenia
Organizations established in 1996
Economy of Armenia